Electronic rock is a music genre that involves a combination of rock music and electronic music, featuring instruments typically found within both genres. It originates from the late 1960s, when rock bands began incorporating electronic instrumentation into their music. Electronic rock acts usually fuse elements from other music styles, including punk rock, industrial rock, hip hop, techno, and synth-pop, which has helped spur subgenres such as indietronica, dance-punk, and electroclash.

Overview
Being a fusion of rock and electronic, electronic rock features instruments found in both genres, such as synthesizers, mellotrons, tape music techniques, electric guitars, and drums. Some electronic rock artists, however, often eschew guitar in favor of using technology to emulate a rock sound. Vocals are typically mellow or upbeat, but instrumentals are also common in the genre.

A trend of rock bands that incorporated electronic sounds began during the late 1960s. According to critic Simon Reynolds, examples included the United States of America, White Noise, and Gong. Trevor Pinch and Frank Trocco, authors of the 2004 book Analog Days, credit the Beach Boys' 1966 hit "Good Vibrations" with having "popularly connected far-out, electronic sounds with rock 'n' roll."

Other early acts to blend synthesizers and musique concrète's tape music techniques with rock instrumentation included Silver Apples, Fifty Foot Hose, Syrinx, Lothar and the Hand People, Beaver & Krause and Tonto's Expanding Head Band. Many such 1960s acts blended psychedelic rock with avant-garde academic or underground influences.

In the 1970s, German "krautrock" bands such as Neu!, Kraftwerk, Can, and Amon Düül challenged rock boundaries by incorporating electronic instrumentation. Since the late 2000s, electronic rock has become increasingly popular.rap latino el chabalon 200 elements music

Subgenres and other terms
The term "progressive rock" (or "prog rock") was originally coined in the 1960s for music that would otherwise be described as "electronic rock," but the definition of "prog" later narrowed into a specific set of musical conventions – as opposed to a sensibility involving forward-thinking or experimental approaches.

Electronic rock is also associated with industrial rock, synth-pop, dance-punk, indietronica, and new wave, with electroclash, new rave, post-punk revival, post-rock, considered as subgenres. Sometimes, certain other electronic subgenres are fused with rock, like trance and techno, leading to the use of the terms trance rock and techno rock, respectively.

Synth-punk

Punk rock has been mixed with electronic music as well, creating subgenres like synth-punk (also known as electropunk) and dance-punk.

Suicide, formed in 1970, would come to be an important synth-punk band. Their sound over their five studio albums mixed punk rock with various electronic-based genres such as electronic rock, synth-pop, and disco. Their first album is widely regarded for setting the stage for subsequent post-punk, synth-pop, and industrial rock acts.

Devo, whilst better known for their 1980 synth-pop song Whip It, also had an electronic sound rooted in punk rock.

The term synth-punk (or electropunk) was coined in 1999 by Damien Ramsey.

In the early-1980s, synth-punk would fuse itself with various electronic genres to create electronic body music, which would influence a number of subsequent industrial dance, industrial rock, and industrial metal acts. It also influenced the hardcore punk inspired digital hardcore as well, which combines hardcore punk with electronic music, noise, and heavy metal. It typically features fast tempos and aggressive sound samples.

In addition, pop punk fused itself with synth-punk to create neon pop.

Synth-metal

Synth-metal is the fusion of heavy metal and electronic music. It was pioneered in the 1980s with Iron Maiden's album Somewhere in Time and Judas Priest's album Turbo, both of which notably incorporate guitar synthesizers.

Besides synth-metal, electronicore, electrogrind, coldwave, and dungeon synth, heavy metal is also sometimes mixed with other electronic genres and their subgenres, inspiring terms such as electronic metal, electronic dance metal, trance metal, and techno metal.

See also
 Alternative dance
 Dance-rock
 Electropop
 List of electronic rock artists

References

 
Electronic music genres
Electropunk
Fusion music genres
British rock music genres
American rock music genres